Squamicornia is a genus of small primitive metallic moths in the family Micropterigidae.

Species
Squamicornia aequatoriella Kristensen & Nielsen, 1982

References

Micropterigidae
Moth genera
Taxa named by Ebbe Nielsen